The 2011 Pacific Games men's football tournament was the 13th edition of Pacific Games men's football tournament. The competition was held in New Caledonia from 27 August to 9 September 2011 with the final played at the Stade Numa-Daly in Nouméa.

Twelve men's teams competed at the Games.

Participants

Format
The 11 teams were drawn or placed into 2 groups. The top 2 teams from the first stage advanced to the semifinal stage. The semifinalists were followed by matches for the Gold Medal (first place) and Bronze Medal (third place).

Squads

Group stage

Group A

Group B

Knockout stage

Bracket

Semifinals

Third place game

Final

Medalists

Goalscorers

10 goals
 Bertrand Kaï

9 goals
 Jean Kaltack

7 goals
 Georges Gope-Fenepej

6 goals

 Benjamin Totori
 Steevy Chong Hue
 Teaonui Tehau

5 goals

 Michel Hmaé
 Nathaniel Lepani
 Hiroana Poroiae

4 goals

 Maciu Dunadamu
 Roy Krishna
 Niel Hans
 Stanley Atani

3 goals

 Avinesh Waran Suwamy
 Iamel Kabeu
 Samuel Kini
 Gari Moka
 Henry Fa'arodo
 Joe Luwi
 James Naka
 Joses Nawo
 Alopua Petoa

2 goals

 Taylor Saghabi
 Alvin Avinesh
 Malakai Kainihewe
 Jason Cunliffe
 Marius Bako
 Jacques Haeko
 César Lolohea
 Jeremy Yasasa
 Daniel Michel

1 goal

 Joseph Ngauora
 John Pareanga
 Tuimasi Manuca
 Seveci Rokotakala
 Taniela Waqa
 Elias Merfalen
 Dylan Naputi
 Karotu Bakaane
 Erene Bakineti
 Arsène Boawé
 Joris Gorendiawé
 Patrick Qaézé
 Kenji Vendegou
 Joël Wakanumuné
 Felix Bondaluke
 Michael Foster
 Cyril Muta
 David Muta
 Mauri Wasi
 Jeffery Bule
 Tome Faisi
 Ian Paia
 Efrain Arañeda
 Stéphane Faatiarau
 Teheivarii Ludivion
 Billy Mataitai
 Taufa Neuffer
 Lorenzo Tehau
 Uota Ale
 James Lepaio
 Togavai Stanley
 Lutelu Tiute
 Richard Garae
 Michel Kaltack
 Selwyn Sese Aala
 Kensi Tangis
 Ricky Tari
 Robert Tasso
 Jean Robert Yelou

Own goal
 Nicholas Funnell (playing against Tahiti)
 Kaake Kamta (playing against Fiji)
 Tauraa Marmouyet (playing against Fiji)

2012 Pacific Cup
In 2010 the Oceania Football Confederation (OFC) announced the creation of a new tournament, the Pacific Cup. Five teams would qualify from the 2011 Pacific Games for the first edition in February 2012 and the New Zealand Olympic team was also invited to participate.

The tournament had initially been planned as part of the qualification tournament for the 2012 OFC Nations Cup, and the OFC's qualification tournament for the 2014 FIFA World Cup. However, FIFA announced a revised format for both tournaments in June 2011, meaning that the Pacific Games were no longer part of qualification, and therefore were not FIFA authorised games.

See also
Women's Football at the 2011 Pacific Games
Pacific Games

References

Mens